Faculty Research Awards 2018 were awarded to academic researchers across 24 disciplines by the Indian Union Minister of Human Resource Development Prakash Javadekar on 20 March in New Delhi. The awards were hosted by news magazine Careers360. The awards recognize the efforts of those in the field of academic research in India. The award carries a cash prize and a citation.

The awardees were chosen on the basis of their academic and research output in Scopus indexed journals, citation index and h-index for the period 2015-17.

References

Education awards
Science and technology awards
 Research awards